The Malta national football team represents Malta in association football and is controlled by the Malta Football Association (MFA), the governing body of the sport in the country. It competes as a member of the Union of European Football Associations (UEFA), which encompasses the countries of Europe. The team's first official match was played on 24 February 1957 in a 3–2 loss against Austria at the Empire Stadium in Gżira.

The team's largest victory was 7–1 against Liechtenstein on 26 March 2008 in a friendly match. Their worst loss is 12–1 against Spain on 21 December 1983 in a qualifying match for UEFA Euro 1984. Michael Mifsud holds the appearance record for Malta, having been capped 142 times since 2000. Misfud also holds the goalscoring record having scored 41 times. As of February 2021, Malta are ranked 184th in the FIFA World Rankings. Its highest ever ranking of 66th was achieved twice in September 1994 and September 1995.

The first match Malta played in the 2020s was a 3–2 loss against the Faroe Islands in the 2020–21 UEFA Nations League (League D).

Matches

2020

2021

2022

References

External links
 Malta national team all time international results

2020s in Malta
Malta national football team results